Charles Emil, Electoral Prince of Brandenburg (16 February 1655, Berlin – 7 December 1674, Strasbourg) was a German prince as heir-apparent to the Electorate of Brandenburg.

Life
He was the second son of Frederick William, Elector of Brandenburg, and his first son to survive infancy - his elder brother William Henry had died at less than two years old in 1649. Born on his father's 35th birthday after six years of unsuccessful pregnancies for his mother Countess Luise Henriette of Nassau. 

He was much hoped-for, looked like his father and was raised to be like him - spirited, quick-tempered and always in favour of war and the hunt (the most effective way of subduing him was always for his tutor to take away his sword for a few days).

In 1670 he was made colonel of the Regiment Radziwiłł zu Fuß and four years later he and his father headed the Brandenburg force on its incursion into Alsace during the Franco-Dutch War. The campaign soon became mired into incessant manoeuvring, with the imperial commanded Bournonville afraid or unwilling to give battle. A cold wet autumn arrived, leading to supply and sanitary problems and disease in the Brandenburg army. Charles became ill late in November and at the start of December was sent to Strasbourg to recover. After seven days of a rising fever, he then died of dysentery.

External links
http://gso.gbv.de/DB=1.28/REL?PPN=004059867&RELTYPE=TT

1655 births
1674 deaths
House of Hohenzollern
Electoral Princes of Brandenburg
Heirs apparent who never acceded
Burials at Berlin Cathedral
Sons of monarchs